Fritz Flachberger (18 February 1912 – 29 July 1992) was an Austrian athlete. He competed in the men's high jump at the 1936 Summer Olympics.

References

1912 births
1992 deaths
Athletes (track and field) at the 1936 Summer Olympics
Austrian male high jumpers
Olympic athletes of Austria
Sportspeople from Salzburg